Leptobrachella nokrekensis is a species of frog in the family Megophryidae. It is endemic to Northeast India and only known from the Nokrek Biosphere Reserve in East Garo Hills district, Meghalaya. Common names Nokrek megophryid frog and Nokrek's spadefoot toad have been proposed for it.

Description
Males measure  and females, based on two specimens,  in snout–vent length. The head is broader than it is long but narrower than the body. The tympanum is sunk and vertically oval; the supratympanic fold is distinct. The eyes are bulging. The dorsum has tubercles and a few longitudinal folds. A prominent skin fold overhangs the vent. The forelimbs are slender and moderate in length. The fingers are free of webbing and have rounded tips that are slightly swollen but not disc-like. The hind limbs are relatively long. The toes have basal webbing. The dorsum is brownish with dark irregular markings all over, powdered with white. There is a triangular mark between the eyes, followed by an inverted "Y"-shaped mark. The belly is creamy and laterally bordered with blackish spots and a line of white glandular tubercles. A pair of reddish warts are located below and above the vent. The forelimbs have cross-bands and the hind limbs have black bands. The iris has a fine dark network or reticulation.

Habitat and conservation
As of May 2020, Leptolalax nokrekensis has not been assessed for the IUCN Red List of Threatened Species, while the India Biodiversity Portal lists it as "data deficient".

References

nokrekensis
Frogs of India
Endemic fauna of India
Amphibians described in 2010